Chanceford Township is a township located in the southeastern portion of York County, Pennsylvania.  The population was 5,935 at the 2020 census. The township is home to several campsites, Allegro Vineyards, and Apollo Park. The Mason-Dixon Trail runs through the township, and it borders the Susquehanna River on the east.

Among notable natives of the township was Johnson K. Duncan, one of a handful of Northern-born Confederate generals in the American Civil War.

History
The Guinston United Presbyterian Church was added to the National Register of Historic Places in 1976.

Geography
The northeastern boundary of the township is the Susquehanna River. The borough of Felton is adjacent to the southwest corner of the township. The township office is located near the center of the township in the unincorporated community of Brogue

Demographics
As of the census of 2000, there were 5,973 people, 2,155 households, and 1,728 families living in the township.  The population density was 123.1 people per square mile (47.5/km2).  There were 2,257 housing units at an average density of 46.5/sq mi (18.0/km2).  The racial makeup of the township was 97.94% White, 0.65% African American, 0.28% Native American, 0.37% Asian, 0.13% from other races, and 0.62% from two or more races. Hispanic or Latino of any race were 0.67% of the population.

There were 2,155 households, out of which 39.1% had children under the age of 18 living with them, 69.8% were married couples living together, 6.2% had a female householder with no husband present, and 19.8% were non-families. 15.5% of all households were made up of individuals, and 6.4% had someone living alone who was 65 years of age or older.  The average household size was 2.77 and the average family size was 3.07.

In the township the population was spread out, with 26.8% under the age of 18, 7.0% from 18 to 24, 33.0% from 25 to 44, 24.1% from 45 to 64, and 9.1% who were 65 years of age or older.  The median age was 36 years. For every 100 females, there were 103.3 males.  For every 100 females age 18 and over, there were 100.4 males.

The median income for a household in the township was $52,931, and the median income for a family was $57,285. Males had a median income of $39,063 versus $24,490 for females. The per capita income for the township was $22,425.  About 2.9% of families and 5.3% of the population were below the poverty line, including 5.6% of those under age 18 and 7.2% of those age 65 or over.

See also
 Jimmy Sheckard

References

Populated places established in 1735
Townships in York County, Pennsylvania
Townships in Pennsylvania